WrestleMania: The Album is the third studio album by the World Wrestling Federation (WWF). It was released in 1993 by Arista Records and RCA Records.

Mike Stock and Pete Waterman (of Britain's famed Stock Aitken Waterman songwriting team) oversaw the project as producers and co-composers for RCA Records, with British A&R executive Simon Cowell serving as the executive producer. The album failed to chart on the US Billboard 200 but reached #10 in the UK. The single "Slam Jam" was certified silver by the British Phonographic Industry in the United Kingdom and reached number four in the UK charts in December 1992.

Track listing
World Wrestling Federation Superstars - "WrestleMania" (Mike Stock, Pete Waterman) 1
World Wrestling Federation Superstars - "Slam Jam" (Mike Stock, Pete Waterman)
"Hacksaw" Jim Duggan - "USA" (Dave Ford, Mike Stock, Pete Waterman)
The Nasty Boys - "Nasty Boy Stomp" (Dave Ford, Mike Stock, Pete Waterman) 2
Bret "Hitman" Hart - "Never Been A Right Time To Say Goodbye" (Mike Stock, Pete Waterman)
The Undertaker - "The Man In Black" (Gary Miller, Mike Stock, Pete Waterman)
"Macho Man" Randy Savage - "Speaking From The Heart" (Asha Elfenbein, Tony King, Mike Stock, Pete Waterman)3
Tatanka - "Tatanka Native American" (Gary Ford, Mike Stock, Pete Waterman)
Mr. Perfect - "I'm Perfect" (Dave Ford) 3
Crush - "Cold Crush" (Paul Waterman) [UK version only]
The Big Boss Man - "Hard Times" (Mike Stock, Pete Waterman) 3
World Wrestling Federation Superstars - "Slam Jam (12" Full Nelson Mix)" (Mike Stock, Pete Waterman) [UK Version only]

Notes
An instrumental version of "WrestleMania" was used as the theme song for WrestleManias X (1994) through XIV (1998).  It was also later used as Linda McMahon's entrance music. 
The Nasty Boys Stomp borrowed the percussion and a very similar bass beat from the song "Visions of China" by Japan as well as "Nasty" by Janet Jackson.
Incorporated elements from the wrestler's entrance music.

Singles
"Slam Jam" (credited to WWF Superstars)
Released: 1992
UK Singles Chart: #4
 Certified silver by the British Phonographic Industry in the UK.
"WrestleMania" (credited to World Wrestling Federation Superstars)
Released: 1993
UK Singles Chart: #14
"USA" (credited to World Wrestling Federation Superstars featuring "Hacksaw" Jim Duggan)
Released: 1993
UK Singles Chart: #71

See also

Music in professional wrestling

References

WWE albums
1993 compilation albums
1993 soundtrack albums
Arista Records soundtracks
RCA Records compilation albums
Arista Records compilation albums
RCA Records soundtracks